Medical information may refer to:

Medical record, individual
Health information, general

See also
Medical information on Wikipedia
Medical Information Bureau, a membership corporation owned by insurance companies in the United States and Canada
Medical Information Technology (disambiguation)